The 2018 New York Red Bulls II season is the club's fourth season of existence, and their third in United Soccer League, the second-tier of the American soccer pyramid. The Red Bulls II play in the Eastern Division of USL.

Club

Coaching staff

Squad information

Appearances and goals are career totals from all-competitions.

Competitions

USL

Eastern Conference standings

Results

Postseason

Player statistics

Top scorers

 Updated to matches played on August 4, 2018.

References 

2018
2018 USL season
American soccer clubs 2018 season
2018 in sports in New Jersey
Red Bulls II